Paracinema tricolor is a species of band-winged grasshopper in the family Acrididae. It is found in Africa, Europe, and the Middle East.

Subspecies
These subspecies belong to the species Paracinema tricolor:
 Paracinema tricolor arabica Uvarov, 1952
 Paracinema tricolor bisignata (Charpentier, 1825)
 Paracinema tricolor bisignatum (Charpentier, 1825)
 Paracinema tricolor tricolor (Thunberg, 1815) (Vlei Grasshopper)

References

External links

 

Oedipodinae
Insect pests of millets